Vani Bhojan  (born 28 October 1988) is an Indian actress who works in Tamil cinema. She made her Telugu film debut with Meeku Maathrame Cheptha in 2019 and her Tamil film debut with Oh My Kadavule in 2020.

Early life and family 
Bhojan was born on 28 October 1988 in Ooty, Nilgiri District, Tamil Nadu to a Badaga family. She did her Schooling in Boarding School, Ooty and Completed her Bachelor of Arts in English Literature in Government Arts College, Stone House Hill, Ooty. Bhojan initially worked as a Ground Staff in Kingfisher Airlines, while studying for a degree in English Literature Her appearance in an advertisement for The Chennai Silks led to her receiving acting offers.

Acting career

Television debut (2010-2016) 
Her first appearance as an actress was in 2010, in a minor role in the Tamil horror film Orr Eravuu. In 2012 she appeared in a supporting role in the Tamil film Adigaram 79. Later she debut in serial Vijay TV's Aaha and Jaya TV’s Maya. She played the lead role in these serial.

In 2013, she was cast in the Sun TV series Deivamagal in the leading role. She played Sathya Priya opposite Krishna. The success of this serial gained her several accolades including the Galatta Nakshatra Award, Sun Kudumbam Viruthukal and Tamil Nadu State Awads for Best Actress. This serial’s success helped her to act in Tamil and Telugu films. She was also seen in Lakshmi Vanthachu directed by Suresh Krissna and V. Sathasivam on Zee Tamil,
where she played three characters, Nandhini, Lakshmi and Jhansi. She Break from television from the success of Deivamagal and to work in film, later she signed numerous film.

Film debut (2012–present) 
In 2012, Vani first appeared in the film 'Adigaram 79', produced by N.F.D.C. 

In 2017, she was seen in the Telugu film Prema. After having completed Deivamagal and Lakshmi Vanthachu, she appeared as a judge in Asathal Chutties on Sun TV and Kings of Comedy Juniors 2 on Vijay TV along with Robo Shankar and Erode Mahesh. In May 2018, Bhojan announced her debut in N4 and said it will be directed by Lokesh Kumar. However, in the middle of 2019 citing date issues, she stepped out of the film. Consequently, her first appearance in a lead role was in 2019, in the Telugu film Meeku Maathrame Cheptha along with Tharun Bhascker. The film was a commercial success. In 2020, she debuted in Tamil film Oh My Kadavule opposite to Ashok Selvan. which was a big success at the box office in 2020 and she Nominated Siima for Best Supporting Actress and Won JFW Awards for Best Supporting Actress 2021. In the same year, she appeared as the lead in the Crime thriller film Lock Up along with Vaibhav Reddy, due to Covid-19 film released on Zee5 and the Tamil web series Triples opposite to Jai released on Hotstar.

In 2021, she again pair up with Vaibhav Reddy in the ZEE5 film Malaysia to Amnesia. In September, She acted in Raame Aandalum Raavane Aandalum produced by Suriya's 2D Entertainment, Which is released in Amazon Prime and she acted journalist in this movie.

In 2022, Bhojan was confirmed film Mahaan with her role reported to be Vikram's love interest; however her scenes did not make the final cut. Film directed by Karthik Subbaraj. Bhojan's next release was the crime thriller Web series Tamil Rockerz, she played a role Forensic officer.

In the media 
Bhojan was ranked in The Times Most Desirable Women on Television at No. 1 in 2017 and No. 3 in 2018 and 2019.  She was also at No. 16 in The Times Most Desirable Women in 2020. Now She is an Brand Ambassador of Zee Thirai.

Filmography

Films 
All shows are in Tamil unless otherwise noted.

Television series 
All shows are in Tamil unless otherwise noted.

Television 
All shows are in Tamil unless otherwise noted.

Awards and nominations

Television

Films

See also 
 List of Indian film actresses
 List of Tamil film actresses
 List of Indian television actresses

References

External links 

 
 

1988 births
21st-century Indian actresses
Actresses from Tamil Nadu
Actresses in Tamil cinema
Actresses in Tamil television
Actresses in Telugu cinema
Indian film actresses
Indian soap opera actresses
Indian television actresses
Indian television presenters
Living people
Tamil actresses
Tamil television actresses